Terry Constantinou (born 25 April 1989) is a Greece international rugby league footballer who plays for the Sunbury Tigers.

Early life
Constantinou was born in Gordon, Victoria and is of Greek descent through his paternal grandparents and his father.

Constantinou attended Parade College in Bundoora, Victoria,  graduating in the class of 2006.

Playing career
In 2013, Constantinou made his debut for the Greek side against Hungary, scoring 3 tries in their 90 - 0 win. 

In 2017, Constantinou was selected in the Australian Combined Affiliated States team to play  as part of their 2017 Rugby League World Cup preparations.

In 2022, Constantinou was named in the Greece squad for the 2021 Rugby League World Cup, the first ever Greek Rugby League squad to compete in a World Cup. Terry Constantinou played in all 3 of Greece's Rugby League World Cup games against France, Samoa and England respectively. Constantinou was chosen as the captain of the Greek side for their 2nd Round match against Samoa.

References

External links
Greece profile
Greek profile

1989 births
Living people
Australian rugby league players
Australian people of Greek descent
Rugby league centres
Rugby league fullbacks
Rugby league second-rows
Rugby league locks
Greece national rugby league team players
Sportsmen from Victoria (Australia)